Noormarkku is a former municipality of Finland.

It is located in the province of Western Finland and was part of the Satakunta region.

Noormarkku is the birthplace of the Ahlstrom Corporation. Antti Ahlström invested in the entire development of Noormarkku, setting up one of Finland's first Finnish language schools and building a road network.

The municipality was unilingually Finnish.

Noormarkku was annexed with the neighboring city of Pori on 1 January 2010.

A notable building is the Villa Mairea by architect Alvar Aalto designed as the private home for Maire and Harry Gullichsen.

References

External links

Municipality of Noormarkku – Official website 

Populated places disestablished in 2010
Former municipalities of Finland
Noormarkku